Metacanthus is a genus of stilt bugs in the family Berytidae. There are more than 20 described species in Metacanthus.

Species
These 26 species belong to the genus Metacanthus:

 Metacanthus acintus Qi & Nonnaizab, 1992
 Metacanthus annulosus (Fieber, 1859)
 Metacanthus antaoensis Lindberg, 1958
 Metacanthus braggodochio (Fernando, 1960)
 Metacanthus calvus (McAtee, 1919)
 Metacanthus concolor White, 1878
 Metacanthus delhiensis (Menon & Ghai, 1959)
 Metacanthus elegans Costa, 1847
 Metacanthus horvathi Stusak, 1964
 Metacanthus jagoensis Lindberg, 1958
 Metacanthus lineatus (Jakovlev, 1875)
 Metacanthus maghrebinus Pericart, 1977
 Metacanthus meridionalis (Costa, 1843)
 Metacanthus microphtalmus Stusak, 1965
 Metacanthus mollis Stusak, 1964
 Metacanthus multispinus (Ashmead, 1887)
 Metacanthus nigricapillus Stusak, 1964
 Metacanthus nitidus Stusak, 1964
 Metacanthus pectoralis Dallas, 1852
 Metacanthus pertenerum Breddin, 1907
 Metacanthus prima (Distant, 1918)
 Metacanthus pulchellus Dallas, 1852
 Metacanthus pusillus (Horvath, 1812)
 Metacanthus tenellus Stal, 1859
 Metacanthus tenerrimus Bergroth, 1912
 Metacanthus transvaalensis Stusak, 1963

References

Further reading

External links

 

Berytidae
Articles created by Qbugbot